Petite Rivière Noire FC is a Mauritian football club based in Tamarin. They play in the Mauritian League, the top division in Mauritian football.
They won the first charity shield between Cercle de joachim SC in 2014.

They won the domestic cup title for the first time in 2007, thus qualifying for the CAF Confederation Cup 2008.

Ground
Their home stadium is Stade Germain Comarmond (cap. 5,000), located in Bambous, Black River District.

Achievements
Mauritian Cup: 3
 2007, 2014, 2015

Performance in CAF competitions
CAF Confederation Cup: 2 appearances
2008 – Preliminary Round
2015 – Preliminary Round

References

External links
zerozerofootball Profile

Football clubs in Mauritius
2000 establishments in Mauritius